Strong gravitational lensing is a gravitational lensing effect that is strong enough to produce multiple images, arcs, or even Einstein rings. For point-like background sources, there will be multiple images; for extended background emissions, there can be arcs or rings. Topologically, multiple image production is governed by the odd number theorem.

Strong lensing was predicted by Albert Einstein's general theory of relativity and observationally discovered by Dennis Walsh, Bob Carswell, and Ray Weymann in 1979. They determined that the Twin Quasar Q0957+561A comprises two images of the same object.

Observations
Most strong gravitational lenses are detected by large-scale galaxy surveys.

Galaxy lensing

The foreground lens is a galaxy. When the background source is a quasar or unresolved jet, the strong lensed images are usually point-like multiple images; When the background source is a galaxy or extended jet emission, the strong lensed images can be arcs or rings. As of 2017, several hundred galaxy-galaxy (g-g) strong lenses have been observed. The upcoming Vera C. Rubin Observatory and Euclid surveys are expected to discover more than 100,000 such objects.

Cluster lensing

The foreground lens is a galaxy cluster. In this case, the lens is usually powerful enough to produce noticeable both strong lensing (multiple images, arcs or rings) and weak lensing effects (ellipticity distortions).  The lensing nicknamed the "Molten Ring" is an example.

Astrophysical applications

Mass profiles
Since gravitational lensing is an effect only depending on gravitational potential, it can be used to constrain the mass model of lenses. With the constraints from multiple images or arcs, a proposed mass model can be optimized to fit to the observables. The subgalactic structures that currently interest lensing astronomers are the central mass distribution and dark matter halos.

Time delays
Since the light rays go through different paths to produce multiple images, they will get delayed by local potentials along the light paths. The time delay differences from different images can be determined by the mass model and the cosmological model.  Thus, with observed time delays and constrained mass model, cosmological constants such as the Hubble constant can be inferred.

Gallery

References

Gravitational lensing